This is a list of artists who were born in the Vietnam or whose artworks are closely associated with that country. 

Artists are listed by field of study and then by family name in alphabetical order (review Vietnamese naming customs as the family name will display in the first name field, with exceptions including people of the diaspora), and they may be listed more than once on the list if they work in many fields of study.

Art collectives 

 Nha San Collective
 The Propeller Group

Architects 
 Hoàng Thúc Hào (born 1970), architect and vice president of the Vietnam Association of Architects
 Ngô Viết Thụ (1927–2000), architect and urbanist
 Nguyễn An (1381–1453), Vietnamese-born Chinese architect of the Ming dynasty and hydraulics specialist between the first and fifth decades of the 15th century
 Võ Trọng Nghĩa (born 1976), architect

Painters 
 Dao Droste (born 1952), Vietnamese-born German sculptor, painter, and installation artist
 Đỗ Quang Em (1942–2021), painter
 Hoàng Hồng Cẩm (1959–2011), painter
 Jun Nguyen-Hatsushiba (born 1968), Japanese-Vietnamese video artist and drawer
 Nguyen Huy An (born 1982), painter, sculptor, installation artist, performance artist 
 Nguyen Manh Hung (born 1976), painter, sculptor, and installation artist
 Bernadette Phan (born 1966), painter and drawer
 Phạm Lực (born 1943), painter
 Trần Quang Hiếu (1938–1985), sketch and panel artist
 Trần Trọng Vũ (born 1964), painter
 Trương Tân (born 1963), painter
 Tú Duyên (1915–2012), folk art painter, and printmaker

Lacquer painters 
 Bui Huu Hung (born 1957), painter, known for lacquer painting
 Công Quốc Hà (born 1955), painter, known for lacquer painting
 Nguyẽ̂n Lam (born 1944), painter, known for lacquer painting
 Phan Kế An (1923–2018), painter and renowned lacquer artist
 Truong Cong Tung (born 1986), painter, known for lacquer painting

Silk painters 
 Trần Văn Thọ (1917–2004), silk painter and watercolorist
 Vũ Giáng Hương (1930–2011), painter, known for silk paintings

Photographers 
 Đoàn Công Tính (born 1943), photographer for the People's Army of Vietnam
 Maika Elan (born 1986), photographer
 Dinh Q. Lê (born 1968), Vietnamese-born American photographer and multimedia artist
 Trần Tuấn Việt (born 1983), photographer
 Nick Ut (born 1951), Vietnamese-born American photojournalist

Sculptors 
 Dao Droste (born 1952), Vietnamese-born German sculptor, painter, and installation artist
 Điềm Phùng Thị (1920–2002), modernist sculptor
 Lê Hiền Minh (born 1979), Dó paper installations, sculptor
 Nguyen Huy An (born 1982), painter, sculptor, installation artist, performance artist 
 Nguyen Phuong Linh (born 1985), conceptual artist, sculptor, installation artist, and video artist
 Nguyễn Thu Thủy (born 1971), mosaicist, and ceramist
 Thu Van Tran (born 1979), Vietnamese-born French sculptor and installation artist

See also 
 List of Vietnamese people
 List of Vietnamese women artists

Artists 
Artists
Vietnamese